Basatin al-Assad is a village in northwestern Syria, administratively part of the Tartus Governorate, located north of Tartus. Nearby localities include Baniyas to the north, Kharibeh to the southeast and al-Bayda to the south. It is situated just east of the Mediterranean coast. 

According to the Syria Central Bureau of Statistics, Basatin al-Assad had a population of 3,288 in the 2004 census. The inhabitants of Basatin al-Assad, as well as Baniyas city, al-Bayda and Marqab, are predominantly Sunni Muslims, in contrast to much of the area which is largely inhabited by members of the Alawite community.

References

Populated places in Baniyas District